Markland is a surname of the following people:

Gene Markland (1919–1999), American baseball player
George Herchmer Markland (1790–1862), Upper Canada politician
James Heywood Markland (1788–1864), English solicitor
Jeremiah Markland (1693–1776), English classical scholar
Peter Markland (born 1951), English chess player
Robert Markland (fl. 1659), English politician
Stuart Markland (born 1948), Scottish footballer
Ted Markland (1933–2011), American actor

Surnames